Petrosal sinus may refer to:

 Inferior petrosal sinus
 Superior petrosal sinus
 Inferior petrosal sinus sampling